Irma Elina Johansson (later Öberg, born 3 April 1932) is a former Swedish cross-country skier. She competed at the 1956 and 1960 Olympics in the 3 × 5 km relay and 10 km events and won two medals in the relay, with a gold in 1960 and a bronze in 1956. Individually she finished in 7–8th place.

Johansson also won a 3 × 5 relay km bronze medal at the 1958 FIS Nordic World Ski Championships. She and her husband worked for three decades as gardeners in Skellefteå before moving back to her native Kalix.

Cross-country skiing results

Olympic Games
 2 medals – (1 gold, 1 bronze)

World Championships
 1 medal – (1 bronze)

References

External links
Swedish skiing medalists 1924-2006 
World Championship results 

1932 births
Living people
People from Kalix Municipality
Cross-country skiers from Norrbotten County
Swedish female cross-country skiers
Olympic cross-country skiers of Sweden
Cross-country skiers at the 1956 Winter Olympics
Cross-country skiers at the 1960 Winter Olympics
Olympic gold medalists for Sweden
Olympic bronze medalists for Sweden
Olympic medalists in cross-country skiing
FIS Nordic World Ski Championships medalists in cross-country skiing
Medalists at the 1956 Winter Olympics
Medalists at the 1960 Winter Olympics